North Liberty Township is one of twelve townships in Yadkin County, North Carolina, United States. The township had a population of 5,770 according to the 2000 census.

Geographically, North Liberty Township occupies  in central Yadkin County.  The only incorporated municipality within North Liberty Township is the Town of Yadkinville, the county seat of Yadkin County.

References

Townships in Yadkin County, North Carolina
Townships in North Carolina